Grădinari is a commune in Olt County, Oltenia, Romania. It is composed of four villages: Grădinari, Petculești, Runcu Mare and Satu Nou.

References

Communes in Olt County
Localities in Oltenia